Justice League: The Flashpoint Paradox is a 2013 direct-to-video animated superhero film adaptation of the 2011 comic book crossover "Flashpoint" by Geoff Johns and Andy Kubert. It is scripted by Jim Krieg and directed by Jay Oliva. The film stars Justin Chambers as Barry Allen / Flash, C. Thomas Howell as Eobard Thawne / Professor Zoom, Michael B. Jordan as Victor Stone / Cyborg, and Kevin McKidd as Thomas Wayne / Batman. The film also sees actors reprising roles from other DC animated properties, including Kevin Conroy as Bruce Wayne / Batman, Nathan Fillion as Hal Jordan / Green Lantern, Ron Perlman as Slade Wilson / Deathstroke, Dana Delany as Lois Lane, Vanessa Marshall as Princess Diana / Wonder Woman and Dee Bradley Baker as Etrigan. It is the 17th film of the DC Universe Animated Original Movies and the first film of the DC Animated Movie Universe, a shared film universe. It was released on July 30, 2013, then re-released on September 10 as a 2-disc special edition. The film received critical acclaim from critics.

Plot
 

Defeating the rogues, he discovers that they have been hired by his arch-enemy Professor Zoom as part of a plan to destroy Central City. With the help of the Justice League, Barry foils Zoom's plot, but Zoom's taunts over the death of his mother still haunt Barry as he departs.

The next day, Barry discovers that the world has radically changed: his powers are gone, his mother is alive, his wife Iris is married to someone else, and the Justice League does not exist. Aquaman and his Atlantean forces have sunk most of Europe, while Wonder Woman has led the Amazons in conquering Great Britain, and both forces are now at war after an attempted alliance between them resulted in Wonder Woman murdering Aquaman's wife Mera after the latter tried to kill the former for having an affair with Aquaman.  Cyborg has assembled a team to eliminate both parties and approaches Batman to join them, but his refusal leads the government to scrap the plan, and instead recruit pilot Hal Jordan to fly an alien spacecraft to bomb the Atlanteans.

Barry visits Wayne Manor, but is attacked by Batmanwho he realizes is not Bruce Wayne but his father Thomas. Attempting to explain things to the elder Wayne, Barry retrieves his costume from his ring, but Professor Zoom's costume appears, causing Barry to believe Zoom is responsible for the timeline alteration. Barry convinces Batman to help, and Batman helps him recreate the accident that gave him his powers, but Barry is severely burned.

In London, Steve Trevor attempts to extricate reporter Lois Lane, but is discovered by the Amazons and killed. The Amazons hunt down Lane, but she is rescued by the local resistance. Meanwhile, in the remains of Paris, Deathstroke and Lex Luthor are attacked and killed by Aquaman's forces while tracking the energy trail of Aquaman's new weapon, which is powered by the captive Captain Atom. 

At the Batcave, after realizing that his memories are changing, Barry asks Batman to recreate the accident again. The second attempt results in success and Barry's powers are restored, but he discovers he cannot travel through time because Zoom is also using the Speed Force. Barry recruits more allies, beginning with Superman, who is a prisoner of the U.S. Government after his ship crashed into Metropolis. With the aid of Batman and Cyborg, they liberate Superman, who is empowered by Earth's yellow sun for the first time and fends off the facility's security then flies off in fear and confusion. Barry collapses as his memories continue to change.

Barry is taken to Billy Batson's home to recuperate, and learns that Jordan's attack has failed and that the final battle between the Amazons and Atlaneans has begun. Barry convinces the superheroes to help stop the war and they depart for Britain aboard Batman's jet, only to be shot down upon arrival. Batson and his siblings combine into Captain Thunder to fight Wonder Woman, while Barry, Cyborg and Batman occupy Aquaman. Batman is wounded. Zoom reveals himself and explains that Barry is responsible for this alternate timeline: Barry traveled back in time to save his mother, fracturing the fabric of reality.  Wonder Woman uses her lasso to force Captain Thunder back into Batson and kills him; Superman arrives but cannot save Cyborg from Aquaman, who then remotely detonates his Captain Atom-powered bomb. As the explosion tears across the landscape, Zoom mocks Barry but is killed by Batman. The dying Batman urges Barry to run, giving him a letter addressed to his son. Barry races back in time and stops his earlier self but again fractures time, creating another alternate timeline.

Barry awakens at his desk and finds that reality is apparently back to normal. After spending a moment with Iris at his mother's grave, Barry visits Bruce Wayne to tell him about everything that occurred. Barry gives Bruce the letter from his father, and Wayne thanks him before Barry runs off. 

In a post-credits scene, a Boom Tube opens in space above Earth and a horde of Parademons emerges.

Voice cast

 Justin Chambers as Barry Allen / The Flash
 C. Thomas Howell as Eobard Thawne / Professor Zoom
 Kevin Conroy as Bruce Wayne / Batman
 Kevin McKidd as Thomas Wayne / Batman
 Michael B. Jordan as Victor Stone / Cyborg
 Dee Bradley Baker as Etrigan the Demon (credited), Top (uncredited), Canterbury Cricket (uncredited)
 Steve Blum as Lex Luthor (credited), Captain Thunder (uncredited)
 Sam Daly as Clark Kent / Kal-El / Superman
 Dana Delany as Lois Lane
 Cary Elwes as Orin / Arthur Curry / Aquaman
 Nathan Fillion as Hal Jordan / Green Lantern
 Grey DeLisle-Griffin as Nora Allen (credited), Young Barry Allen (uncredited), Martha Wayne / Joker (uncredited)
 Jennifer Hale as Iris West (credited), Billy Batson (uncredited)
 Danny Huston as General Sam Lane
 Danny Jacobs as Cole Cash / Grifter (credited), Leonard Snart / Captain Cold (uncredited)
 Peter Jessop as Dr. Vulko
 Lex Lang as Nathaniel Adam / Captain Atom (credited), Funeral Presider (uncredited)
 Vanessa Marshall as Princess Diana / Wonder Woman
 Candi Milo as Persephone (credited), Pedro Pena (uncredited)
 Ron Perlman as Slade Wilson / Deathstroke
 Kevin Michael Richardson as President of the United States (credited), James Forrest (uncredited)
 Andrea Romano as Doris (credited), Central City Newsreader (uncredited)
 James Patrick Stuart as Steve Trevor (credited), George "Digger" Harkness / Captain Boomerang (uncredited), Orm Marius / Ocean Master (uncredited)
 Hynden Walch as Yo-Yo

Soundtrack

The soundtrack to Justice League: The Flashpoint Paradox was released on September 10, 2013. The music was composed by Frederik Wiedmann.

Reception

Critical reception

Critics and audiences said that the film stays true to its source material. Its rating is PG-13 for its bloody violence and strong language.

IGN gave a Justice League: The Flashpoint Paradox 8.5/10, and said it has outdone its source material. It called the style "sleek and hard-hitting", praised C. Thomas Howell's voice acting which it said brought "unnerving dread", and stated that it is the "most hardcore DC animated movie to date", although it also warns against the level of violence and said the numerous cameos "detract from the main story".

Sales
The film earned $33,504,083 from domestic home video sales.

DC Animated Movie Universe

The post-credits scene in Justice League: The Flashpoint Paradox sets up the film Justice League: War which officially began the DC Animated Movie Universe. A plot point towards the end of the film is also revisited and expanded in Suicide Squad: Hell to Pay, which also belongs to the DC Animated Movie Universe continuity. It is also revisited in the final film Justice League Dark: Apokolips War of this continuity when John Constantine looks into Barry Allen's mind after freeing him from Darkseid's slavery.

See also
 List of DC Multiverse worlds

Notes

References

External links

 Justice League: The Flashpoint Paradox at Internet Movie Database
 Justice League: The Flashpoint Paradox at 

2013 animated films
2013 direct-to-video films
2013 films
2010s direct-to-video animated superhero films
2010s animated superhero films
American animated science fiction films
Alternate timeline films
Adultery in films
Apocalyptic films
2010s English-language films
DC Universe Animated Original Movies
DC Animated Movie Universe
American dystopian films
Flash (comics) in other media
Animated Justice League films
Films about nuclear war and weapons
Films based on works by Geoff Johns
Films scored by Frederik Wiedmann
Films set in London
Films set in Paris
Animated films about time travel
2010s American animated films
Films directed by Jay Oliva
2010s science fiction films